Emma Flood (born 13 October 1990) is a former tennis player from Norway.

In her career, she won three singles titles and two doubles titles on tournaments of the ITF Women's Circuit. On 4 May 2015, she reached her best singles ranking of world No. 483. On 13 October 2014, she peaked at No. 749 in the doubles rankings.

Playing for Norway Fed Cup team, Flood has accumulated a win–loss record of 11–15.

She hails from Stabekk and represents the local tennis club there, Stabekk TK.

ITF finals

Singles (3–2)

Doubles (2–1)

References

External links
 
 
 

1990 births
Living people
Sportspeople from Bærum
Norwegian female tennis players
21st-century Norwegian women